Zachary Taylor Wellington House is a historic home located at Huntington, Cabell County, West Virginia. It is a two-story I house form dwelling.  It was originally constructed about 1847, as a small, -story, hall-and parlor house. About 1870, an addition and substantial changes were made giving the house its current appearance with Folk Victorian detailing.  The house is associated with Zachary Taylor Wellington (18 April 1847 – 25 August 1923) a prominent Republican politician who served in numerous public offices while residing in Guyandotte.

It was listed on the National Register of Historic Places in 2008.

References

Houses on the National Register of Historic Places in West Virginia
Houses in Huntington, West Virginia
National Register of Historic Places in Cabell County, West Virginia
Victorian architecture in West Virginia
Houses completed in 1847
1847 establishments in Virginia